Pseudostellaria heterophylla, known commonly as hai er shen (kid ginseng, child ginseng), tai zi shen (crown prince ginseng), and false starwort, is an adaptogen in the family Caryophyllaceae that is used in Chinese medicine and herbalism to tonify the qi and generate yin fluids. It is known as the "ginseng of the lungs". The plant is a low growing plant of the pink family that is grown in Southern China in the provinces of Jiangsu, Anhui, Shandong, Heilongjiang, Jilin, Liaoning, Hebei, Henan, Shaanxi, Zhejiang, Jiangxi, Hubei, and Shanxi.

Ethnobotany
Haiershen is a relatively recent addition to the Chung Yao Chi New Chinese Materia Medica, having been officially added in 1959, based upon local and ethnic use. It is weaker than Panax ginseng. The herb is a mild adaptogen, demulcent, an immune tonic, nutritive, and a pectoral herb. In Chinese terms it tonifies the yin. Accordingly, the herb is restorative for lung damage due to excess heat or dryness including hot or dry asthma, pleurisy, bronchitis, bacterial pneumonia, wheezing, dry cough, and emphysema. Scientific research shows that this Pseudostellaria aids in protecting the mucin layer that lines the respiratory tract and functions as an immune defense system. In the form Li Gan Zi Shen Tang ("Regulate the Liver & Enrich the Kidneys Decoction") it is used to treat yin deficiency associated with diabetes mellitus. The polysaccharide fractions have in vitro anti-tumor properties. A lectin in the roots is being studied for anti HIV purposes.

This is a perennial herb with tubers and solitary erect stems up to 20 centimeters tall.

The flower has 5 white petals, but some flowers are cleistogamous and lack petals.

See also
Adaptogen
Herbalism
Chinese Medicine

References

heterophylla
Flora of Zhejiang
Herbs
Medicinal plants